Craft Alliance Center of Art + Design ("Craft Alliance") is an arts education center and 501(c)(3) non-profit located in St. Louis, Missouri, USA. Founded in 1964, the organization's stated mission is to "enrich and empower communities through craft."

History
Craft Alliance was founded in 1964 as a cooperative gallery, operated by regional craft-based artists in the city of St. Louis. By 1966, Craft Alliance was offering visual arts classes to the community and presenting exhibitions of contemporary craft in the gallery. In 1969 Craft Alliance moved to the western end of the Delmar Loop in University City — at that time an economically depressed street on the border between St. Louis City and St. Louis County. By 2007, The American Planning Association had designated the Delmar Loop as one of "10 Great Streets in America" through its Great Places in America program because of "the sustained efforts of local business, government and the community to achieve successful physical and economic revitalization."

Also in 2007, Craft Alliance's Board of Directors elected to open a satellite facility in Grand Center, the arts and entertainment district of St. Louis city. Located in the Kranzberg Building, Craft Alliance at Grand Center now complements Craft Alliance's University City facility by offering community outreach programs to St. Louis City children and teens, and educational courses for the public in clay, metals, graphics and textiles.

In 2021, Craft Alliance (previously known as Craft Alliance Center of Art + Design) consolidated and moved their location 2 miles east down Delmar Blvd. to 5080 Delmar Blvd. Now part of the Delmar Maker District in conjunction with Third Degree Glass Factory and MADE, Craft Alliance settles into their personalized, retrofitted home. They offer classes, camps, workshops, exhibitions, artist residencies, and house a beautiful gift shop full of handmade art.

Overview
Nationally recognized as one of the premier craft organizations in the country alongside schools like Penland, Arrowmont and Lillstreet, Craft Alliance is dedicated to the study of traditional craft mediums within contemporary contexts. Craft Alliance offers annual exhibition programming with a focus on contemporary craft; classes and workshops in ceramic art, metal-smithing, fibers (weaving, felting, etc.), 3D fabrication (3D printing, laser cutting, CNC), graphics (3D modeling, graphic design), and woodturning; artist residencies, free community programs for area families and local schools; and a gallery shop. With an annual operating budget of $1.8 million, Craft Alliance serves more than 50,000 people every year.

Notable figures
A number of notable artists have taught, studied, or exhibited work at Craft Alliance throughout the past 50 years.

Past exhibiting artists
 Kate Anderson
 Rudy Autio
 Howard Ben Tre
 Wendell Castle
 Sonya Clark
 Cynthia Consentino
 Lia Cook
 Richard DeVore
 Paul Dresang
 Ruth Duckworth
 Chris Gustin
 Michael Lucero
 Ed Moulthrop
 Richard Notkin
 Albert Paley
 Guerra de la Paz
 Ed Rossbach
 Joyce Scott
 Heikki Seppä
 Therman Statom
 Jane Sauer
 Ester Shimazu
 Helen Shirk
 Victor Spinski
 Aiko Takamori
 Patti Warashina
 Beatrice Wood
 Betty Woodman

Teaching artists
 Tom McCarthy
 Peg Fetter
 Qun Liu
 Melissa Schmidt
 Lisa Colby

References

External links
 Craft Alliance Center of Art + Design

Non-profit organizations based in St. Louis
Education in St. Louis
Art schools in Missouri
Tourist attractions in St. Louis
Culture of St. Louis
Crafts educators
1964 establishments in Missouri
Organizations established in 1964
Contemporary crafts museums in the United States